is a greatest hits album by Japanese duo Pink Lady, released on June 1, 1979. It features the duo's singles from "Pepper Keibu" to "Pink Typhoon (In the Navy)", as well as their accompanying B-side songs.

Track listing 
All lyrics are written by Yū Aku, except where indicated; all music is composed and arranged by Shunichi Tokura, except where indicated.

Charts

See also
Golden Best ~ Complete Single Collection - a newer compilation album with a similar track listing.

References

1979 greatest hits albums
Pink Lady (band) compilation albums
Victor Entertainment compilation albums